The twenty-eighth series of the British television drama series Grange Hill began broadcasting on 10 January 2005, before ending on 23 March 2005 on BBC One. The series follows the lives of the staff and pupils of the eponymous school, an inner-city London comprehensive school. It consists of twenty episodes.

Cast

Pupils

Teachers

Others

Episodes

DVD release
The twenty-eighth series of Grange Hill has never been released on DVD as of 2014.

Notes

References

2005 British television seasons
Grange Hill